Koszyce  is a town in Proszowice County, Lesser Poland Voivodeship, in southern Poland. It is the seat of the gmina (administrative district) called Gmina Koszyce. The village has a population of 830.

The history of Koszyce dates back to the year 1328, when the village was for the first time mentioned in documents. On June 26, 1374, Elizabeth of Poland granted Magdeburg rights to Koszyce. There are undocumented speculations that Koszyce had received town charter before that date, and Queen Elizabeth only confirmed this fact. The town became a royal property, and was granted the right to organize weekly fairs on Mondays. On April 4, 1421, Koszyce's privileges were confirmed by King Wladyslaw Jagiello, probably because the 1374 document had been lost. The town prospered in the 15th century, due to a location along an important merchant trail from Krakow to Sandomierz. Furthermore, at the nearby village of Morsko was a busy Vistula river port.

At that time, Koszyce had its coat of arms, a rectangular market square and a town hall. It also had a suburb called Jawiczowice. First mention of Koszyce's parish church comes from mid-15th century. The town was governed by a wojt, together with a council. In the mid-17th century, there were app. 70 artisans at Koszyce. The town had a Holy Cross hospital and a parish school, and among its most famous residents was a physician named Jakub Grzywna, who moved to Koszyce from Krakow in 1520, and died here in 1531.

The decline of Koszyce was marked by the catastrophic Swedish invasion of Poland, when it was ransacked and burned by the Swedish and Transilvanian invaders. After the Partitions of Poland, Koszyce was first annexed by the Habsburg Empire, and in 1815 – 1915, it belonged to the Russian-controlled Congress Poland. During the January Uprising, Koszyce was one of the most important centers of the rebellion, and as a reprisal, the town was stripped of its charter on June 1, 1869.

References

External links

 Jewish Community in Koszyce on Virtual Shtetl

Koszyce
Kraków Voivodeship (14th century – 1795)
Kielce Governorate
Kielce Voivodeship (1919–1939)